Sarbojaya is an 2021 Indian Bengali Language Drama television series which is premiered on 9 August 2021 on Bengali general entertainment channel Zee Bangla and it's also available on ZEE5 before it's telecast. The show is produced by Snehasish Chakraborty of Blues Productions and stars Debasree Roy, Kushal Chakraborty and Sanghamitra Talukdar. This show marked the comeback of Debashree Roy in the television industry after 25 years. The show went off air on 14 May 2022 due to low viewership and was replaced by Khelna Bari.

Plot
Sarbojaya (or Jaya) belongs from a simple middle-class family in North Kolkata. She married Sanjay, a rich businessman with a gold heart. After her marriage she is humiliated by her-in-laws for her middle class attitude but is always supported by her husband and her daughter. Sarbojoya loves dancing, reading Rabindranth Tagore's novels but she is prevented from doing these.

Cast

Main
Debasree Roy as Sarbojaya Chowdhury aka Jaya: Sanjay's wife, Sara's mother and Zishan's mother-in-law
Kushal Chakraborty as Sanjay Chowdhury: a successful businessman; Sarbojoya's husband, Sara's father and Zishan's father-in-law
 Sanghamitra Talukdar as Sara Sen (née Chowdhury): Sarbojaya and Sanjay's daughter, Zishan's wife
 Pronnoy Chandra as Zishan Sen: a cricketer, Sara's husband

Recurring
Moumita Gupta as Madhura Chowdhury (née Roy): Goutam's wife, Rajib, Yuvaan and Jinda's mother and Sarbojoya's elder sister-in-law
Supriyo Dutta as Goutam Chowdhury: Sanjay's elder brother; Madhura's husband, Rajib, Yuvaan and Jinda's father and Sarbojoya's elder brother-in-law
 Swagata Mukherjee as Manini Chowdhury: Kushan's wife, Rakha and Pragya's mother and Sarbojoya's younger sister-in-law
 Rana Mitra as Kushan Chowdhury: Sanjay's younger brother; Manini's husband, Rakha and Pragya's father and Sarbojoya's younger brother-in-law
 Manoj Ojha as Rajib Chowdhury: Darshana's husband and Madhura's elder son
 Mahua Halder as Darshana Chowdhury: Rajib's wife and Madhura's daughter-in-law
 Aditya Chowdhury as Yuvaan Chowdhury: Madhura's younger son and Urvi's lover
 Shobhana Bhunia as Jinda Chowdhury: Madhura's daughter
 Roshni Ghosh as Rakha Chowdhury: Manini and Kushan's daughter
 Payel Tarafdar as Pragya Chowdhury: Manini and Kushan's daughter
 Debjoy Mallick as Monoshij Roy: Madhura's brother
 Rupsha Chatterjee as Urvi: Yuvaan's lover.
 Mayukh Chatterjee as Makhon: Zishan's friend
 Joy Badlani as Mr.Bindra: the Chowdhury family's neighbour
 Dipankar De as Bogola: Jaya's Uncle
 Susmita Chanda as Piu Sen: Sanjay's office colleague and Kushan's lover
 Debjani Chattopadhyay as Swarnachapa Karmakar: Claims to be Sanjay's wife
 Mallika Banerjee as Atryee: Zishan's aunt
 Jagriti Goswami Ghatak as Rathi
 Judhajit Banerjee as Ajit Poddar

Reception
The show obtained third spot of the TRP leaderboard after debut on Bengali television from its first week.

Adaptations

References

External links
Sarbojaya at ZEE5

Bengali-language television programming in India
Zee Bangla original programming
2021 Indian television series debuts